The National Slave Memorial is a proposed memorial to honor the victims of slavery in the United States. It was introduced during a 2003 Congressional session. Professor Ira Berlin noted that the proposed memorial is an example of the interest Americans in the early 21st century still have in the facts and legacy of slavery. The legislation has not been adopted; instead, Congress supported the creation of the National Museum of African American History and Culture, which opened on the National Mall in 2016.

References

External links
Public law which introduced the memorial
Full bill, from Thomas

Proposed monuments and memorials in the United States
National Park Service areas in Washington, D.C.
Monuments and memorials in Washington, D.C.
Monuments and memorials to victims of slavery in the United States